Otar Korkia (Georgian: ოთარ ქორქია, ; 10 May 1923 – 15 March 2005) was a Georgian professional basketball player and coach. He was named one of FIBA's 50 Greatest Players, in 1991. He was also named the Best Georgian Basketball Player of the 20th Century, and the Best Georgian Sportsman of the 20th Century. He was born in Kutaisi.

Playing career

Club career
During his club career, Korkia played with Dinamo Kutaisi, from 1940 to 1947, and with Dinamo Tbilisi, from 1947 to 1958. He won three USSR League championships (1950, 1953, and 1954) and two USSR Cups, (1949 and 1950).

National team career
Korkia was a member of the senior Soviet Union national basketball team, which won the silver medal at the 1952 Summer Olympic Games. He played in seven games during that tournament. He later became the captain of the senior Soviet national team. 

He also won gold medals at the 1947 EuroBasket, the 1951 EuroBasket, and the 1953 EuroBasket. Additionally, he won the bronze medal at the 1955 EuroBasket.

Coaching career
Korkia was the head coach of Dinamo Tbilisi, when the club won the FIBA European Champions Cup (later called EuroLeague) championship, in the 1961–62 season. He was named an Honored Coach of the USSR, in 1967.

Titles won

Player
 USSR League (3): 1950, 1953, 1954
 USSR Cup (2): 1949, 1950
 EuroBasket (3): 1947, 1951, 1953

Head coach
 EuroLeague (1): 1962

Personal life
Korkia died in Tbilisi, aged 81. His nephew, Mikheil, was also a well-known senior Soviet national basketball team player.

See also 
 List of EuroLeague-winning head coaches

References

External links
FIBA Profile
FIBA Europe Profile
Sports-Reference.com Profile
Databaseolympics.com Profile
GEORGIA LOSES LEGEND KORKIA

1923 births
2005 deaths
Basketball coaches from Georgia (country)
Basketball players at the 1952 Summer Olympics
BC Dinamo Tbilisi coaches
BC Dinamo Tbilisi players
BC Kutaisi 2010 players
Centers (basketball)
EuroLeague-winning coaches
FIBA EuroBasket-winning players
Medalists at the 1952 Summer Olympics
Men's basketball players from Georgia (country)
Mingrelians
Olympic basketball players of the Soviet Union
Olympic medalists in basketball
Olympic silver medalists for the Soviet Union
Soviet basketball coaches
Soviet men's basketball players
Sportspeople from Kutaisi
Honoured Masters of Sport of the USSR